Is My Palm Read is a 1933 Pre-Code Fleischer Studios animated short film starring Betty Boop, and featuring Koko the Clown and Bimbo.

Plot
Betty visits Bimbo the fortune teller for some advice, but Bimbo is only interested in making time with Betty. Bimbo's crystal ball predicts that Betty will be shipwrecked on a desert isle (during which time she sings part of the Irving Berlin song "All by Myself"), and attacked by evil spirits resembling poltergeists, but rescued by Bimbo. When Bimbo reveals himself by removing his fake beard, a happy Betty embraces him. Unfortunately, a group of the ghosts from the vision burst in on this scene, and chase the two to the desert isle. Betty and Bimbo eventually escape from the ghosts by tricking them into going off a cliff into the sea.

Alternate versions
This short was hand-colorized for a 1972 re-release. Colorized prints (mainly television prints) by Fred Ladd's Color Systems are missing several scenes, including three risqué (and uncensored) clips;

 A strategically placed light reveals Betty's nude outline under her dress
 Bimbo's crystal ball shows a nude baby Betty taking a bath
 The waves that wash Betty to shore on an island spank her once. Then she walks ashore and takes off her wet outer clothes out of sight behind what appears to be a boulder, but it turns out to be a turtle that sticks out its head and legs and walks off, exposing Betty in her underwear and bra. She blushes and runs behind some shrubs, where she puts on a skirt made of palm leaves (with her bra exposed) before reappearing.

References

External links
 
 Is My Palm Read at the Big Cartoon Database

1933 short films
Betty Boop cartoons
1930s American animated films
American black-and-white films
1933 animated films
Paramount Pictures short films
Fleischer Studios short films
Short films directed by Dave Fleischer
Animated films about dogs
1930s English-language films
American animated short films
Films set on islands